The South Lodge Hotel is a 19th-century five star country house hotel set near Horsham, West Sussex in the south of England.

The hotel has also been used in a number of feature films including the 2014 film A Dark Reflection.

History
In 1883, Frederick DuCane Godman began development on the original South Lodge modest dwelling in the same neo-Jacobean style as many other Sussex country houses of the period. Godman commenced the final substantial additions to the building in 1911 when the Drawing Room Wing was constructed. Winston Churchill was a regular guest to the house during his time in Parliament and to commemorate this the corridor through to the newly developed Sussex Wing from the Billiard Bar now marks the place where a lift used to take him up to the Elizabeth Le Bay room. During World War II South Lodge was used as a hospital and the country house opened as a hotel in 1985.

In 2018, an Inquest was opened following "an unnatural death" of then Home Secretary Sajid Javid's brother at the hotel.

Grounds

Location
South Lodge is located southeast of Horsham, West Sussex in the south of England.

References

External links

Hotels in West Sussex
Companies based in West Sussex
Horsham
Houses completed in 1883